Kujendra Lal Tripura (born 4 November 1963) is a Bangladesh Awami League politician and the incumbent member of parliament for Khagrachhari District. He is the chairman of the Taskforce on Tribal Refugees.

Early life
Tripura was born 4 November 1963 in Khagrachari District. He has a B.A. degree. He is from Tipra/Tripuri community which is known Tripura in Bangladesh.

Career
Tripura was elected to parliament from Khagrachhari District in 2014 as a Bangladesh Awami League candidate. On 8 February 2018 he was made the chairman of the Taskforce on Rehabilitation of Returnee Refugees and Internally Displaced Persons. The post chairman which is the held power of The State Minister on that affair.
Before that he served as "chairman" of Khagrachhari Hill District Council from 2010 to 2013.

Tripura inaugurated the rally of The traditional Sangrain Festival of the Marma community in Khagrachari in 2017. Boisu Programme-2022 by Tipra Community inaugurated by Kujendra Lal Tripura in Khagrachari. Tripura donated 10lac taka to 58 Temples for Durga Puja. He inaugurated Three Day Raj Punah by Mong Circle in Khagrachari. Five SAFF champion indigenous girls receive grand reception in Khagrachari by Kujendra Lal Tripura.

References

Living people
1963 births
People from Khagrachhari District
Awami League politicians
10th Jatiya Sangsad members
11th Jatiya Sangsad members
Tripuri people
Bangladeshi Hindus